The following low-power television stations broadcast on digital or analog channel 32 in the United States:

 K32AB-D in Yuma, Colorado
 K32AG-D in Parowan/Enoch, etc., Utah
 K32CA-D in Battle Mountain, Nevada
 K32CC-D in Montgomery Ranch, etc., Oregon
 K32CJ-D in Ely, Nevada
 K32CQ-D in Shurz, Nevada
 K32CW-D in Montrose, Colorado
 K32DC-D in Kanab, Utah
 K32DE-D in Pendleton, Oregon
 K32DK-D in Watertown, South Dakota
 K32DW-D in Chloride, Arizona
 K32DY-D in Medford, Oregon
 K32EB-D in Alexandria, Minnesota
 K32EH-D in Memphis, Texas
 K32EM-D in Morongo Valley, California
 K32EX-D in Peetz, Colorado
 K32EY-D in Dove Creek, etc., Colorado
 K32FI-D in Yoncalla, Oregon
 K32FW-D in Pierre, South Dakota
 K32FY-D in Park Rapids, Minnesota
 K32GB-D in Agana, Guam
 K32GD-D in Guymon, Oklahoma
 K32GK-D in Elko, Nevada
 K32GW-D in Carson City, Nevada
 K32GX-D in St. James, Minnesota
 K32HA-D in Bonners, Idaho
 K32HF-D in Florence, Oregon
 K32HH-D in Kalispell, Montana
 K32HK-D in Morgan, etc., Utah
 K32HL-D in Rulison, Colorado
 K32HP-D in Hanna, etc., Utah
 K32HQ-D in Boulder, Utah
 K32HV-D in Vernal, etc., Utah
 K32HX-D in Duchesne, Utah
 K32IA-D in Manila, etc., Utah
 K32IC-D in Altus, Oklahoma
 K32IF-D in North Fork, etc., Wyoming
 K32IG-D in Ellensburg, etc., Washington
 K32IJ-D in Cortez, Colorado
 K32IK-D in San Luis Valley, Colorado
 K32IS-D in Henefer, etc., Utah
 K32IT-D in Coalville and adjacent area, Utah
 K32IU-D in Wanship, Utah
 K32IX-D in Lihue, Hawaii
 K32IZ-D in Scofield, Utah
 K32JB-D in Fountain Green, Utah
 K32JI-D in Emery, Utah
 K32JL-D in Powers, Oregon
 K32JN-D in Big Piney, etc., Wyoming
 K32JQ-D in Manhattan, Kansas
 K32JT-D in Farmington, New Mexico
 K32JU-D in Tampico, etc., Montana
 K32JW-D in Fillmore, etc., Utah
 K32JZ-D in Kabetogama, Minnesota
 K32KC-D in Montpelier, Idaho
 K32KO-D in Garden Valley, Idaho
 K32KP-D in Black Butte Ranch, Oregon
 K32KQ-D in Orovada, Nevada
 K32KT-D in Wichita Falls, Texas
 K32KY-D in Pasco, Washington
 K32LO-D in Prescott, Arizona
 K32LQ-D in Yreka, California
 K32LS-D in Driggs, Idaho
 K32LT-D in San Luis Obispo, California
 K32LX-D in Soda Springs, Idaho
 K32LY-D in La Grande, Oregon
 K32LZ-D in Alton, Utah
 K32MC-D in Baker Flats Area, Washington
 K32MD-D in Cheyenne Wells, Colorado
 K32ME-D in Camp Verde, etc., Arizona
 K32MF-D in Red Lake, Minnesota
 K32MG-D in Enid, Oklahoma
 K32MH-D in Washington, etc., Utah
 K32MI-D in Delta/Oak City, etc, Utah
 K32MK-D in Park City, Utah
 K32ML-D in Rural Garfield County, Utah
 K32MN-D in Howard, Montana
 K32MO-D in Capitol Reef National Park, Utah
 K32MP-D in Caineville, Utah
 K32MQ-D in Fremont, Utah
 K32MR-D in Escalante, Utah
 K32MT-D in Tropic, etc., Utah
 K32MU-D in Hanksville, Utah
 K32MV-D in Antimony, Utah
 K32MW-D in Logan, Utah
 K32MX-D in Randolph & Woodruff, Utah
 K32MY-D in Heber/Midway, Utah
 K32MZ-D in Samak, Utah
 K32NA-D in Ridgecrest, California
 K32NB-D in Beaver etc., Utah
 K32NC-D in Toquerville, Utah
 K32ND-D in Modena, etc., Utah
 K32NE-D in Garrison, etc., Utah
 K32NF-D in Spring Glen, Utah
 K32NG-D in Green River, Utah
 K32NH-D in Ferron, Utah
 K32NI-D in Clear Creek, Utah
 K32NK-D in Lincoln City, etc., Oregon
 K32NL-D in Deming, New Mexico
 K32NM-D in Des Moines, Iowa
 K32NO-D in Glenwood Springs, Colorado
 K32NQ-D in Salmon, Idaho
 K32NR-D in Winnemucca, Nevada
 K32NT-D in Crested Butte, Colorado
 K32NU-D in Haxtun, Colorado
 K32NV-D in Malad City, Iowa
 K32NW-D in Mina/Luning, Nevada
 K32OB-D in Panaca, Nevada
 K32OC-D in Corpus Christi, Texas
 K32OE-D in Alamogordo, New Mexico
 K32OF-D in Elk City, Oklahoma
 K32OG-D in Pueblo, Colorado
 K32OI-D in Eureka, California
 K32OK-D in Woody Creek, Colorado
 K32OL-D in Redstone, Colorado
 K32OV-D in Lubbock, Texas
 K32OX-D in Lucerne Valley, California
 K32PB-D in Lake Charles, Louisiana
 K38DZ-D in Joplin, Montana
 K40DJ-D in Coolin, Idaho
 K46LY-D in Livingston, Montana
 K48KC-D in Cottage Grove, Oregon
 K50HJ-D in Litchfield, California
 KABI-LD in Snyder, Texas
 KAJS-LD in Lincoln, Nebraska
 KBLT-LD in Anchorage, Alaska
 KDDC-LD in Dodge City, Kansas
 KDYS-LD in Spokane, Washington
 KEJR-LD in Phoenix, Arizona
 KFAW-LD in Midland, Texas
 KFKK-LD in Stockton, California
 KFKZ-LD in Cedar Falls, Iowa
 KGBS-CD in Austin, Texas
 KJEO-LD in Fresno, California
 KLNM-LD in Lufkin, Texas
 KMTI-LD in Manti and Ephraim, Utah
 KMYN-LD in Duluth, Minnesota
 KNET-CD in Los Angeles, California, uses KNLA-CD's spectrum
 KNLA-CD in Los Angeles, California
 KPMC-LD in Bakersfield, California
 KPTO-LD in Pocatello, Idaho
 KQKC-LD in Topeka, Kansas
 KRMS-LD in Lake Ozark, Missouri
 KRMV-LD in Riverside, California
 KRUM-LD in Seattle, Washington
 KSBT-LD in Santa Barbara, California
 KSTV-LD in Sacramento, California
 KTFV-CD in McAllen, Texas
 KUMO-LD in St Louis, Missouri
 KUPT-LD in Albuquerque, New Mexico
 KYPK-LD in Yakima, Washington
 W32CV-D in Ironwood, Michigan
 W32DH-D in Erie, Pennsylvania
 W32DJ-D in Melbourne, Florida, to move to channel 19
 W32EG-D in Williams, Minnesota
 W32EI-D in Port Jervis, New York, to move to channel 33
 W32EO-D in Tryon, etc., North Carolina
 W32EQ-D in Tuscaloosa, Alabama
 W32EV-D in Adamsville, Tennessee
 W32EW-D in Roanoke, Virginia
 W32FB-D in Ceiba, Puerto Rico
 W32FD-D in Louisa, Kentucky
 W32FE-D in Hartwell & Royston, Georgia
 W32FH-D in St. Petersburg, Florida
 W32FI-D in Brevard, North Carolina
 W32FJ-D in Montgomery, Alabama
 W32FK-D in Valdosta, Georgia
 W32FN-D in Macon, Georgia
 W32FS-D in Bangor, Maine
 W32FW-D in Adams, Massachusetts
 W32FY-D in Clarksburg, West Virginia
 WAAO-LD in Andalusia, Alabama
 WACX-LD in Alachua, etc., Florida
 WANF-LD in Jackson, Tennessee
 WANN-CD in Atlanta, Georgia
 WBMA-LD in Birmingham, Alabama
 WBTS-CD in Nashua, New Hampshire, uses WGBX-TV's full-power spectrum
 WBXH-CD in Baton Rouge, Louisiana
 WCTA-LD in Columbus, Georgia
 WDRN-LD in Fayetteville, North Carolina
 WHDN-CD in Naples, Florida
 WKHU-CD in Kittanning, Pennsylvania
 WLPD-CD in Plano, Illinois
 WMVH-CD in Charleroi, Pennsylvania
 WNDR-LD in Auburn, New York
 WQEO-LD in Memphis, Tennessee
 WRNT-LD in Hartford, Connecticut
 WRZB-LD in Washington, D.C.
 WSJU-LD in Ceiba, Puerto Rico
 WSRG-LD in Scranton, Pennsylvania
 WTHV-LD in Huntsville, Alabama
 WTKO-CD in Oneida, New York
 WUCB-LD in Cobleskill, New York
 WYFX-LD in Youngstown, Ohio
 WZPA-LD in Philadelphia, Pennsylvania

The following low-power stations, which are no longer licensed, formerly broadcast on digital or analog channel 32:
 K32DR-D in Granite Falls, Minnesota
 K32DS in Evanston, Wyoming
 K32EL-D in Shoshoni, Wyoming
 K32FE in Tucumcari, New Mexico
 K32FN in Wenatchee, Washington
 K32FR in Orangeville, Utah
 K32HB in Manhattan, Kansas
 K32HD in Huntsville, Utah
 K32HO-D in Fruitland, Utah
 K32JE-D in Quincy, Washington
 K32JG-D in Rapid City, South Dakota
 K32JJ-D in Rolla, Missouri
 K32JK-D in Boise, Idaho
 K32JM-D in Twin Falls, Idaho
 K32NP-D in Billings, Montana
 KCLG-LD in Neosho, Missouri
 KDMD-LP in Fairbanks, Alaska
 KKAM-LP in Kailua-Kona, Hawaii
 KMBU-LP in Enterprise, Utah
 KYWF-LD in Wichita Falls, Texas
 W32DU-D in La Grange, Georgia
 WBAX-LD in Albany, New York
 WBWM-LP in Mount Pleasant, Michigan
 WDYH-LD in Augusta, Georgia
 WEEE-LP in Knoxville, Tennessee
 WMNE-LP in Portland, Maine
 WWRD-LP in Dayton, Ohio

References

32 low-power